Anomiopus virescens is a species of true dung beetle that can be found in Bolivia, Brazil and Paraguay. It can be found in the cerrado biome and surrounding areas, and is likely to be nocturnal and a myrmecophile.

References

virescens
Beetles described in 1842